Grand Forks was the name of a provincial electoral district in the Canadian province of British Columbia centred on the town of Grand Forks, in the Boundary Country between the Okanagan and Kootenay Countries.  The riding first appeared as the result of a redistributing of the former West Kootenay (south riding) which also created Greenwood, Rossland City, Nelson City, and Ymir (electoral district) in 1903. In 1924, the area of the Grand Forks riding was merged with that of the Greenwood riding to create Grand Forks-Greenwood. The area is currently represented by West Kootenay-Boundary.

For a complete list of historical and current ridings in the Kootenay district of British Columbia, Canada, please see Kootenay (electoral districts).

Electoral history 
Note:  Winners in each election are in bold.

|Liberal
|William Henry Clement
|align="right"|173 	
|align="right"|23.04

|- bgcolor="white"
!align="right" colspan=3|Total valid votes
!align="right"|751 
!align="right"|100.00%

|Liberal
|Herbert Watson Gregory
|align="right"|160
|align="right"|21.68%
|align="right"|
|align="right"|unknown

|- bgcolor="white"
!align="right" colspan=3|Total valid votes
!align="right"|738 
!align="right"|100.00%
!align="right"|
|- bgcolor="white"
!align="right" colspan=3|Total rejected ballots
!align="right"|
!align="right"|
!align="right"|
|- bgcolor="white"
!align="right" colspan=3|Turnout
!align="right"|%
!align="right"|
!align="right"|
|- bgcolor="white"
!align="right" colspan=7|
|}

|Liberal
|Daniel Patterson
|align="right"|150 	
|align="right"|15.00%
|align="right"|
|align="right"|unknown
|- bgcolor="white"
!align="right" colspan=3|Total valid votes
!align="right"|1,000
!align="right"|100.00%
!align="right"|
|- bgcolor="white"
!align="right" colspan=3|Total rejected ballots
!align="right"|
!align="right"|
!align="right"|
|- bgcolor="white"
!align="right" colspan=3|Turnout
!align="right"|%
!align="right"|
!align="right"|
|- bgcolor="white"
!align="right" colspan=7|
|}

|- bgcolor="white"
!align="right" colspan=3|Total valid votes
!align="right"| - 
!align="right"| -.-%
!align="right"|
|- bgcolor="white"
!align="right" colspan=3|Total rejected ballots
!align="right"|
!align="right"|
!align="right"|
|- bgcolor="white"
!align="right" colspan=3|Turnout
!align="right"|%
!align="right"|
!align="right"|
|}

|Liberal
|James Edwin Wallace Thompson
|align="right"|584
|align="right"|63.62%
|align="right"|
|align="right"|unknown
|- bgcolor="white"
!align="right" colspan=3|Total valid votes
!align="right"|918
!align="right"|100.00%
!align="right"|
|- bgcolor="white"
!align="right" colspan=3|Total rejected ballots
!align="right"|
!align="right"|
!align="right"|
|- bgcolor="white"
!align="right" colspan=3|Turnout
!align="right"|%
!align="right"|
!align="right"|
|}

 
|Liberal
|Ezra Churchill Henniger
|align="right"|390
|align="right"|50.39%
|align="right"|
|align="right"|unknown

|- bgcolor="white"
!align="right" colspan=3|Total valid votes
!align="right"|774
!align="right"|100.00%
!align="right"|
|- bgcolor="white"
!align="right" colspan=3|Total rejected ballots
!align="right"|
!align="right"|
!align="right"|
|- bgcolor="white"
!align="right" colspan=3|Turnout
!align="right"|%
!align="right"|
!align="right"|
|}

Sources 

Elections BC Historical Returns

Former provincial electoral districts of British Columbia